Leprechaun 2 (also known as One Wedding and Lots of Funerals in the United Kingdom) is a 1994 American fantasy comedy horror film directed by Rodman Flender and written by Turi Meyer and Al Septien. The sequel to Mark Jones' Leprechaun (1993) and the second entry in the Leprechaun series, the plot centers on the psychopathic leprechaun Lubdan (Warwick Davis) as he hunts for a bride and for his gold.

Leprechaun 2 was released on April 8, 1994 to a box office total of $2.3 million. Panned by critics, it was the final installment to receive a theatrical release. A sequel, Leprechaun 3, was released direct-to-video the following year.

Plot
1000 years ago in Ireland, an evil Leprechaun celebrates his 1,000th birthday on St. Patrick's Day. He tells his slave, a man named William O'Day, that he has found the perfect bride. Once he marries, the Leprechaun promises to grant O'Day his freedom. O'Day is overjoyed at first, but is horrified to see the Leprechaun has chosen his beautiful daughter. Despite O'Day's pleas, the Leprechaun says that she will be his once she sneezes three consecutive times without anyone saving her by saying "God bless you". Once the Leprechaun manipulates her to start sneezing, O'Day says "God bless you, my child", freeing her from the Leprechaun. O'Day is then killed by the Leprechaun, who promises to marry an O'Day descendant on his next thousandth birthday.

On St. Patrick's Day in present-day Los Angeles, a young man named Cody Ingalls works with his uncle Morty giving "dark side" tours, a scam that drives tourists to alleged resting places of celebrities. When Morty is too drunk to drive, Cody does so, forcing him to cancel a date with his girlfriend Bridget Callum. He drops Bridget off at a go-kart track run by his pretentious rival Ian Joyce. Prior to Bridget's departure, the Leprechaun emerges from one of the tour stops: an Irish tree that was present at the home of Harry Houdini. The Leprechaun tears out the gold tooth of a homeless man and goes off to search for his new bride, revealed to be Bridget (a descendant of the O'Day bloodline). A frustrated Cody speeds through a red light and is arrested. Morty picks him up from the police station.

Ian drives Bridget home and attempts to force his way inside her home to hook up with her, but she punches him. As he's leaving, Ian sees Bridget beckoning him to come into the garage. The sight is revealed to be a trick by the Leprechaun, who has given a running lawnmower her appearance. Ian is killed as he goes to kiss what he thinks are her breasts, but are actually the spinning mower blades. Cody visits Bridget and gifts her flowers, and they reconcile. The Leprechaun has snuck inside and begins to make her sneeze which Cody thinks is caused by the flowers and attempts to say "God bless you" but suddenly begins to be strangled by a phone cord before he can finish saying it. The Leprechaun then appears to claim her. After a scuffle with Cody, he escapes with Bridget, but loses one of his gold coins after Bridget knocked the pot of gold from his hands, which lands in Cody's possession.

The Leprechaun takes her to his lair and plans to make her his bride, but realizes a coin is missing. He leaves to get the coin back. Since Cody left the flowers behind, he is considered a prime suspect in Ian's death and Bridget's disappearance. Cody returns home and consults a book with Morty. They learn about the Leprechaun's search for a bride and that cast iron is his one weakness. The Leprechaun suddenly attacks, demanding his coin back. Cody makes a deal to give the coin in exchange for Bridget, unaware the Leprechaun plans to double-cross him. Morty intervenes and they escape to a bar celebrating St. Patrick's Day. Morty notices the Leprechaun at the bar and challenges to a drinking contest, reasoning with Cody that Bridget can't be harmed as long as the Leprechaun is with him. Morty wins the contest, but the Leprechaun escapes. The Leprechaun sobers up at an espresso bar, killing an obnoxious barista. Remembering the Leprechaun's weakness, Cody and Morty go to the go-kart track and empty the facility's cast-iron safe, intending to capture the Leprechaun inside.

A security guard nearly catches them, but Morty knocks him out. As the arriving Leprechaun attacks Morty, Cody is able to trick and capture him inside the safe. However, Morty locks Cody in a supply closet and demands the Leprechaun give him three wishes, as is tradition. Morty first wishes for the Leprechaun's pot of gold. The wish is unspecifically granted, as the pot manifests inside Morty's stomach. The Leprechaun says he can help remove it, tricking Morty into using his second wish to set him free from the safe. For his final wish, Morty asks for the pot to be removed, and the Leprechaun does so by tearing his stomach open, killing Morty. Cody escapes the closet, but is apprehended by the security guard, who believes Cody responsible for all the killings. The Leprechaun suddenly attacks them with a go-kart, killing the security guard. He attempts to run over Cody, but Cody discovers that he can't be killed as long as he has the gold coin. He makes his way to the Leprechaun's lair.

In the lair, Cody defeats the living skeleton of O'Day and frees Bridget. They attempt to escape the labyrinth-like lair, but get separated. Cody finds Bridget, who asks Cody to give the coin to her. He does so, and she is revealed to be the Leprechaun in disguise. The real Bridget reappears and begs the Leprechaun to spare Cody, but the Leprechaun forces Cody to drive a cast iron stake into himself. Cody's death is revealed to be a ruse (he knew of the Leprechaun's trick), as he gave the Leprechaun a chocolate coin he was given at the bar and is still immune to the Leprechaun's attacks. Cody rises and stabs the Leprechaun with the stake, causing him to violently combust. Cody and Bridget escape the lair. Cody discards the gold coin, remarking that it's "not worth it". They emerge in the sunlight together and kiss.

Cast
 Warwick Davis as Lubdan The Leprechaun
 Charlie Heath as Cody Ingalls
 Shevonne Durkin as Bridget Callum
 Durkin also plays O'Day's daughter in the prologue.
 Sandy Baron as Mortimer "Morty" Ingalls
 James Lancaster as William O'Day
 Adam Biesk as Ian Joyce
 Linda Hopkins as Housewife
 Warren A. Stevens as Security Guard
 Arturo Gil as Pub Drunk
 Kimmy Robertson as Tourist's Girlfriend
 Clint Howard as The Tourist
 Billy Beck as Homeless Man
 Al White as Sergeant Kelly
 Martha Hackett as Detective
 Tony Cox as Black Leprechaun
 Mark Kiely as Tim Streer
 Michael McDonald as The Waiter

Release 
In its U.S. opening weekend, the film played in 252 theaters and grossed $672,775. Its final domestic box office was $2.3 million.

Reception 
Leprechaun 2 holds an approval rating of 6% on review aggregator website Rotten Tomatoes, based on 17 reviews. Kevin Thomas of the Los Angeles Times wrote that it has better writing, production values, acting, and humor than the original. TV Guide stated that the film is an improvement over its predecessor, though "cynically contrived even by schlock horror standards". Marc Savlov of The Austin Chronicle critiqued that the film is a complete rehash of the original. Discussing the rationale for a Leprechaun sequel with Fangoria, Warwick Davis said, "Money's definitely the answer", alluding to a pay increase for his role as the titular villain. The film inspired the Los Angeles business venture Dearly Departed Tours, which opened in 2005.

References

External links 
 
 

1994 films
1994 horror films
American supernatural horror films
American slasher films
Films set in 1994
Films scored by Jonathan Elias
1990s English-language films
Leprechaun (film series)
Trimark Pictures films
Holiday horror films
Films set in the 1990s
Films directed by Rodman Flender
1990s American films